The 210th Rescue Squadron (210 RQS) is a unit of the Alaska Air National Guard 176th Wing located at Joint Base Elmendorf-Richardson, Anchorage, Alaska. The 210th is equipped with the HH-60G Pave Hawk helicopter.

Mission
The wartime mission of the 210th is combat search and rescue to locate and recover downed fighter pilots. The day-to day mission is to perform an 11AF 24-hour Alaska Theater Search and Rescue Alert. A by-product of the two missions is civilian search and rescue. The 210th is one of the busiest Air Force combat search and rescue squadrons in the world. with an average of one search and rescue mission a week in addition to regular training and mission.  To date, the 210th has launched on over 500 missions resulting in over 300 lives saved and over 100 lives assisted. The 210th Rescue Squadron passed its 310th rescue in 1996.

History

10th Air Rescue Squadron
Nicknamed "The Second 10th", the 210th RQS has been bestowed the Lineage and Honors history of the 10th Air Rescue Squadron (ARS), an active duty squadron organized at Elmendorf Field in 1946 and mostly manned by Alaskans. The 10th had itself inherited the tradition of the 924th Quartermaster Company, Boat (Aviation), a rescue unit which was constituted in Alaska on 14 June 1942, saw action during the Aleutian Island Campaign, was redesigned the 10th Emergency Rescue Boat Squadron on 3 July 1944, and was inactivated on 8 March 1946.   During the late 1940s and early 1950s, the 10th ARS operated detachments at Elmendorf AFB, Ladd AFB and Naval Air Station Adak.  The squadron operated a mixture of OA-10s, OA-12s, SB-17 Flying Fortress, C-45s, L-5s, LC-126As, R-5 Helicopters and CG-4 Gliders.

10th Air Rescue Group

Expanded into the 10th Air Rescue Group on 14 November 1952, the Alaska Air Command unit expanded its detachments into squadrons.  This resulted in the assignments of the 71st and 72d Air Rescue Squadrons to Elmendorf AFB; the 73d Air Rescue Squadron to Adak Naval Station, and the 74th Air Rescue Squadron to Ladd AFB.   The 72d and 73d were inactivated in September and November 1953 in response to the withdrawal of Air Force units from the Aleutian Islands.

During this period, the 10th ARG became widely known as "The Guardian of the North" and provided support not only to the military but also to the civilian communities.  The group established a pattern that would be followed in the years ahead.   A rescue coordination center was maintained at Elmendorf AFB 24/7/365 to coordinate search-and-rescue activities, which included any support given by civilian agencies throughout the territory of Alaska.

The 10th's responsibility were threefold: search, aid and rescue.  The search function was performed by specially equipped aircraft and ground vehicles, as well as dog teams which were used occasionally.  Aid was rendered by highly trained paramedics, who were capable of para-rescuing to the rescue scene if necessary.  Rescue was carried out by several means, including the use of helicopters, amphibious and conventional aircraft, and surface vehicles.  The unit also provided support to the Alaskan Air Command's air defense system.

In 1957, with the steady decline of Alaskan Air Command forces, Headquarters, USAF, questioned the need to continue the group, particularly in the face of budget reductions and the contemplated reduction of search-and-rescue forces worldwide.  The 10th Air Rescue Group was inactivated on 8 January 1958 and the 71st ARS was inactivated 18 March 1960.  However, the rescue coordination center at Elmendorf was retained and officially designated the Alaskan Command Rescue Coordination Center.

During the 1960s search-and-rescue activities were assigned to the 17th Coast Guard District for offshore and close-to-shore operations.  The Alaskan Air Command was assigned everywhere else

The 71st ARS, however, was re-designated as the 71st Aerospace Rescue and Recovery Squadron on 25 Nov 1969 and re-activated on 8 March 1970. After re-activation, the 71st served Alaska proudly during the 1970s and 1980s including the rescue of 74 people from the sinking cruiseship MS Prinsendam in the Gulf of Alaska on 4 October 1980.

Modern era

In 1987, the Air Force announced the 71st would again be inactivated. However, the tradition of Arctic search and rescue would continue; Alaska Senator Ted Stevens introduced legislation creating a new search and rescue unit for the Alaska Air National Guard. The 210th ARS received federal recognition from the National Guard Bureau on 4 April 1990 and the unit activation ceremony was held at Kulis Air National Guard Base on 11 August 1990. The 210th took delivery of its new Sikorsky HH-60 "Pave Hawk" search and rescue helicopters between June and August 1990 and new Lockheed HC-130 search/tanker aircraft in November and December 1990. The unit achieved initial operational capability faster than the normal Air Force programming process normally allows.

The 210th began sharing the 24 hour Alaska Theater overland helicopter Search and Rescue alert with the inactivating 71st ARS on 1 January 1991 and assumed the entire helicopter alert on 1 April 1991. The HC-130 began daytime alert in April 1991 and assumed 24 hour alert in May 1991. The 71st ARS inactivated on 30 June 1991. (Subsequently, the 71st ARS has been re-activated as an active Air Force unit at Patrick Space Force Base, Florida). In January 1992, the 210th achieved combat-ready status. In 1993, additional aircraft were added to the squadron inventory. On 1 January 1994, Detachment 1, 210th RQS was activated at Eielson Air Force Base, Alaska, to perform search and rescue for Eielson-based fighters and to perform logistical range support for the northern military ranges. In early 1995, more new HH-60 aircraft joined the 210th and the original HH-60s were transferred to other units. In 1996, the squadron received new HC-130 aircraft and transferred its original HC-130s to another unit. The 210th possesses state-of-the-art "force multipliers". Its Pararescue officers and men are all highly trained in all manner of combat insertion and recovery, including SCUBA and military freefall parachute; all the men are Paramedics and even the officers are Emergency Medical Technicians.

On  8 October 2004 by the Air Force Special Operations Command re-organized Air National Guard rescue units and created separate squadrons for fixed-wing, helicopter and pararescue elements of the 210th Rescue Squadron.  The HH-60 helicopter flight became 210th Rescue Squadron; the HC-130(H)N Hercules flight became the 211th Rescue Squadron, and the pararescue flight became the 212th Rescue Squadron.

Lineage
 Constituted as 10th Air Rescue Squadron, and activated on 1 April 1946
 Redesignated: 10th Air Rescue Group, 14 November 1952
 Inactivated on  8 January 1958
 Constituted as: 210th Air Rescue Squadron, and allocated to Alaska ANG in 1990
 Received federal recognition on 4 April 1990
 Activated on 11 August 1990, bestowed history, lineage, honors and colors of USAF 10th Air Rescue Group
 Redesignated: 210th Rescue Squadron, 16 March 1992

Assignments
 Alaskan Air Command, 1 April 1946
 10th Air Division, 1 November 1950 – 8 January 1958
 176th Composite Group, 11 August 1990
 176th Group, 1 January 1993
 176th Operations Group, 1 October 1995 – present

Components
 71st Air Rescue Squadron, 14 November 1952 – 8 January 1958
 72d Air Rescue Squadron, 14 November 1952 – 30 September 1953
 73d Air Rescue Squadron, 14 November 1952 – 30 November 1953 (GSU at Adak Naval Station, Alaska)
 74th Air Rescue Squadron, 14 November 1952 – 8 January 1958 (GSU at Ladd Air Force Base, Alaska)

Stations
 Elmendorf Air Force Base, Alaska, 1 April 1946 – 8 January 1958
 Kulis Air National Guard Base, Alaska, 11 August 1990
 Joint Base Elmendorf-Richardson, Alaska, 18 February 2011 – present

Aircraft

 SA-16 Albatross, 1952-1960
 Sikorsky H-5, 1954-1955
 C-54 Skymaster, 1954-1955
 Sikorsky SH-19, 1954-1956

 SC-54 Skymaster, 1955-1958
 SH-21 Shawnee, 1956-1958
 HC-130 Hercules, 1990-2004
 HH-60G Pave Hawk, 1990 – present

References

 71st Rescue Squadron at AFHRA
 Chloe, John Hale, (1984), Top Cover for America. the Air Force in Alaska. 1920–1983, Pictorial Histories Publishing Company, 
 Rogers, B. (2006). United States Air Force Unit Designations Since 1978. 
 B29 Crash on Glacier in Alaska

Further reading
 Drury, Bob. The Rescue Season: A True Story of Heroism on the Edge of the World (also titled The Rescue Season: The Heroic Story of Parajumpers on the Edge of the World). New York: Simon & Schuster, 2001. . About the 210th Rescue Squadron during the 1999 climbing season on Denali.

External links

Squadrons of the United States Air National Guard
Military units and formations in Alaska
210